Hsinbyushin Bridge is a bridge over the Chindwin river between Sagaing Region and Magway Region in Myanmar. It is located on the Chaung-U-Pakokku highway.

References

Buildings and structures in Sagaing Region
Bridges in Myanmar
Road-rail bridges
Buildings and structures in Magway Region